Maharloe Lake is a seasonal salt lake in the highlands of the area of Shiraz, Iran.  southeast of Shiraz, the lake salt is rich in potassium and other salts.

Rudkhane-ye-Khoshk, a seasonal river flowing through the city of Shiraz, brings most of the flood water to the lake bed during intensive precipitation events. The lake water typically evaporates by the end of summer and exposes the white lake bed. By mid-summer and due to high evaporation rates and salt concentrations,  the lake water turns pinkish red as a result of the red tide within the lake.

See also
 Dasht-e Arzhan
 Lake Parishan

References

Lakes of Iran
Landforms of Fars Province
Saline lakes of Asia